The 1981 NCAA Division I Wrestling Championships were the 51st NCAA Division I Wrestling Championships to be held. Princeton University in Princeton, New Jersey hosted the tournament at Jadwin Gymnasium.

Iowa took home the team championship with 129.75 points and having two individual champions.

Gene Mills of Syracuse was named the Most Outstanding Wrestler and Jerry Kelly of Oklahoma State received the Gorriaran Award.

Team results

Individual finals

References

NCAA Division I Wrestling Championship
NCAA
Wrestling competitions in the United States
NCAA Division I  Wrestling Championships
NCAA Division I  Wrestling Championships
NCAA Division I  Wrestling Championships